Schmotime is the debut album by indie rock band Absentee, released in 2006.

Critical reception
PopMatters wrote that "Schmotime presents a wry look at a world that's filled with people destroying themselves and each other."

Track listing
 "More Troubles"
 "We Should Never Have Children"
 "Getaway"
 "Hey Tramp"
 "You Try Sober"
 "There's A Body In A Car Somewhere"
 "Weasel"
 "Truth Is Stranger Than Fishin'"
 "Duck Train"
 "Something To Bang"
 "Treacle"

Personnel
Dan Michaelson - vocals

References

2006 albums